The 2011–12 season was APOEL's 72nd season in the Cypriot First Division and 84th year in existence as a football club.

Season review

Pre-season and friendlies
The first training session for the season took place on 8 June 2011 at GSP Stadium. On 19 June 2011, the team flew to Obertraun in Austria to perform the main stage of their pre-season training. APOEL returned to Cyprus on 2 July 2011. During the pre-season training stage in Austria, APOEL participated in Salzburg Airport Cup and played in total four friendly matches.

Domestic Competitions

Laiki Bank League
APOEL completed the regular season of the 2011–12 Cypriot First Division having 17 wins, 5 draws and 4 losses, scoring 39 goals and conceding 13 goals. So, APOEL entered championship play-offs from the third place with 56 points, four points behind leaders AEL Limassol (60 points) and one point behind second placed Omonia (57 points).

In the first championship play-off match, APOEL won Omonia by 2–1, with a last-minute winner from Gustavo Manduca and moved up to the second place, only two points behind leaders AEL Limassol who on the same day drew 1–1 at Anorthosis. In the second play-off match, APOEL suffered a 2–1 home loss from Anorthosis and leaders AEL Limassol (who at the same day won Omonia by 2–0) gained a five-points advantage. In the next play-off match, Ivan Tričkovski's last-minute winner helped APOEL beat AEL Limassol 1–0 at home, to reduce AEL's lead to just two points. Another match between AEL Limassol and APOEL followed one week later, but the two teams drew 0–0 in Limassol and AEL remained two points clear of APOEL, with only two matches remaining. On 5 May 2012, APOEL lost from Omonia at home by 2–1 and at the same day AEL Limassol crowned champions by beating Anorthosis 1–0 at Limassol. In the last match of the season, APOEL won Anorthosis at Larnaca by 2–1 and secured the second place in the league.

LTV Super Cup
On 7 August 2011, APOEL won the 2011 Cypriot Super Cup by beating Omonia 1–0 in the GSP Stadium. The winner came from Christos Kontis in the 81st minute.

Cypriot Cup
In the first round of the 2011–12 Cypriot Cup, APOEL eliminated Akritas Chlorakas by winning 9–1 in a knock-out match which was held at GSP Stadium. In the last 16 of the Cup, APOEL faced up AEL Limassol in a two-legged tie and lost 0–1 on aggregate. In the first match at GSP Stadium, APOEL lost 0–1 from a Patrick Vouho's goal in the 40th minute. On the return leg, APOEL was held to a 0–0 draw, and so eliminated very early from the competition.

UEFA Champions League

The team won the Cypriot championship last season and as such entered the 2011–12 UEFA Champions League second qualifying round. A successful campaign saw them through to the 2011–12 UEFA Champions League group stages by eliminating Skënderbeu Korçë (6–0 agg.), Slovan Bratislava (2–0 agg.) and Wisła Kraków (3–2 agg.). APOEL drawn in Group G, alongside F.C. Porto, Shakhtar Donetsk and Zenit St. Petersburg.

On 13 September 2011, APOEL hosted Zenit St. Petersburg in GSP Stadium and secured its first ever victory in the UEFA Champions League group stage proper with a 2–1 comeback victory against the Russian side. Konstantin Zyryanov put Zenit ahead in the 63rd minute but APOEL was rewarded for its attacking play 10 minutes later when Gustavo Manduca pounced on a loose ball in the box and slotted the ball into the Zenit net. The winner came two minutes later when Brazilian striker Aílton evaded the Zenit defense and shot into the far corner past goalkeeper Vyacheslav Malafeev.
In its second match in the group, APOEL held Shakhtar Donetsk to a 1–1 draw at the Donbass Arena and stayed in first place in the group. APOEL took the lead when the striker Ivan Tričkovski finished off a counterattack in the 61st minute. Shakhtar equalised three minutes later when Jádson scored.
Another away match followed against F.C. Porto and APOEL drew 1–1 at Dragão to extend its unbeaten start and keep them on the top of Group G. Brazilian forward Hulk put F.C. Porto ahead after 13 minutes with a curving free-kick from distance and APOEL levelled six minutes later when Aílton received the ball close to the Porto area, dribbled past Fernando and sent a diagonal shot that gave the goalkeeper Helton no chance to block. However, on the last minute of added time APOEL could have won the match, but substitute Aldo Adorno was denied the winner by a block from Helton.
On 1 November 2011, APOEL hosted F.C. Porto in GSP Stadium and Gustavo Manduca's last-minute winner meant APOEL remained unbeaten at the top of Group G, securing at least a place in the 2011–12 UEFA Europa League knockout phase. On 42nd minute, Aílton was tripped by Eliaquim Mangala and the referee immediately signaled a penalty. The Brazilian striker stepped up and sent Helton the wrong way, scoring his third goal in the competition. On the 89th minute F.C. Porto won a penalty and Hulk made no mistake from the spot, equalizing for the visitors. It looked like the Portuguese side had salvaged a draw, but in the 90th minute Constantinos Charalambides fired in an accurate cross and found Gustavo Manduca in the box, whose left-footed strike from close range sealed the win for APOEL. 

On 23 November 2011, APOEL made history and became the first Cypriot team to reach the last 16 of the UEFA Champions League by holding Zenit St. Petersburg to a 0–0 draw in Petrovsky Stadium. APOEL eventually reached the last 16 as a group winner, despite losing its unbeaten record after a 0–2 home defeat by Shakhtar Donetsk on the final match day. Luiz Adriano (who had in the first half a penalty saved by Urko Pardo) and Yevhen Seleznyov scored second-half goals for Shakhtar to win its first group stage match that season, but APOEL stayed top of Group G after Zenit St. Petersburg drew 0–0 at F.C. Porto.

In its first participation to the UEFA Champions League last 16, APOEL drawn against French side Olympique Lyonnais. The first leg was held at Stade de Gerland on 14 February 2012, in front of over 5,000 travelling APOEL supporters. Lyon overcame APOEL's tight defense with a second-half goal by Alexandre Lacazette and secured a slender advantage by winning 1–0. In the second leg which was held at GSP Stadium on 7 March 2012, Gustavo Manduca's ninth-minute opener levelled the tie 1–1 on aggregate. After 90 minutes and 30 minutes of extra time the game remained 1–0 for APOEL and went to a penalty shoot-out. On the penalty shoot-out, Dionisis Chiotis made two saves by diving to his left to block penalties from Alexandre Lacazette and Michel Bastos, while APOEL converted all four of its own spot kicks and won 4–3, reaching the UEFA Champions League quarter-finals for the first time.

APOEL has been drawn to face Spanish giants Real Madrid in the quarter-finals. In the first leg which was held at GSP Stadium on 27 March 2012, APOEL stood well for 74 minutes, but Real Madrid ran out 3–0 winners thanks to late goals from Karim Benzema (74', 90') and Kaká (82'). In the return leg which was held at Santiago Bernabéu on 4 April 2012, Real Madrid took a 2–0 lead in the first half by Cristiano Ronaldo's (26') and Kaká's (37') goals. Gustavo Manduca scored a goal for APOEL in the 67th minute after an excellent through ball from Aílton, but Ronaldo scored his second goal with a free-kick in the 75th minute to make it 3–1 for Real Madrid. Substitute José Callejón scored in the 80th minute but two minutes later APOEL won a penalty after Hamit Altıntop brought down Aldo Adorno and Esteban Solari beat Iker Casillas from the spot to make it 4–2. Finally, another goal scored by Ángel Di María in the 84th minute and Real Madrid won by 5–2, reaching the semi-finals with an aggregate score of 8–2 and giving an end to APOEL's impressive run in the competition.

Current squad
Last Update: 19 January 2012

For recent transfers, see List of Cypriot football transfers summer 2011.
 Also, see List of Cypriot football transfers winter 2011–12.

International players 

 Dionisis Chiotis
 Ivan Tričkovski

 Nektarios Alexandrou
 Constantinos Charalambides
 Marios Elia
 Tasos Kissas
 Savvas Poursaitides
 Marinos Satsias
 Athos Solomou

 Marios Antoniades (U-21)
 Andreas Christofides (U-21)
 Emilios Panayiotou (U-21)

Foreign players 

EU Nationals
 Paulo Jorge
 Nuno Morais
  Hélio Pinto
 Hélder Sousa
 Dionisis Chiotis
  Savvas Poursaitides
  Urko Pardo

EU Nationals (Dual citizenship)
  Esteban Solari
  Gustavo Manduca
  Marcinho
  Aldo Adorno

Non-EU Nationals
 Aílton
 William Boaventura
 Kaká
 Marcelo Oliveira
 Ivan Tričkovski

Squad changes

In:

Total expenditure:  €340K

Out:

Total income:  €300K
{|

Club

Management

Kit

|
|
|

Other information

Squad stats

Top scorers

Last updated: 13 May 2012
Source: Match reports in Competitive matches

Captains
  Marinos Satsias
  Constantinos Charalambides
  Marios Elia
  Hélio Pinto

Pre-season friendlies

Mid-season friendlies

Competitions

Overall

Laiki Bank League

Classification

Results summary

Results by round

Play-offs
The first 12 teams are divided into 3 groups. Points are carried over from the first round.

Group A

Matches
Kick-off times are in EET.

Regular season

Play-offs

UEFA Champions League

Qualifying phase

Second qualifying round

APOEL won 6–0 on aggregate.

Third qualifying round

APOEL won 2–0 on aggregate.

Play-off round

APOEL won 3–2 on aggregate.

Group stage

Group G standings and fixtures

Matches

Knockout phase

Round of 16

1–1 on aggregate. APOEL won 4–3 on penalties.

Quarter-finals

Real Madrid won 8–2 on aggregate.

LTV Super Cup

APOEL won the 2011 Cypriot Super Cup (12th title).

Cypriot Cup

First round

Second round

AEL Limassol won 1–0 on aggregate.

References

2011-12
APOEL F.C. season
2011–12 UEFA Champions League participants seasons